Shaheen Khan (born 1960 in Moshi, Tanzania) is a British film, television and stage actress and playwright of Indian descent, based in London.

Career

Film and television
Khan is best known for her role as Mrs Bhamra in the 2002 film Bend It Like Beckham. Other films in which she has performed include Bhaji on the Beach (1993)  and It's a Wonderful Afterlife (2010). On television, she has had a recurring role in Casualty and a guest role in the Doctor Who episode Demons of the Punjab.

Theatre
As a playwright, Khan has written several performances for BBC Radio 4 with Sudha Bhuchar, the most successful of which was Girlies (1997). Also with Bhuchar, she wrote the stage play Balti Kings, which debuted in 1999 and was produced by Tamasha Theatre Company. Balti Kings was also rewritten by both for its appearance in Sydney, Australia, where it was renamed to The Curry Kings of Parrammatta. Another production involving Tamasha and Bhuchar was A Tainted Dawn, which covered sketches relaying real accounts of the 1947 Partition of India and its impact on communities, which Khan starred in for two separate sketches. A co-written screenplay with Bhuchar, The House across the Street, was created as a part of a new writer's initiative at the BBC and aired on BBC4. In 2015 she played Lady Macbeth in a contemporary Asian production of Macbeth produced by multicultural theatre production company Tara Arts.

Awards and honours
For her role in Bend It Like Beckham, Khan earned a 2003 nomination for a Satellite Award for best Supporting Actress. As a British Indian, she has been recognized for her contributions to the arts with an Asian Women of Achievement Award.

Filmography

References

External links
 

British film actresses
British television actresses
British stage actresses
British actresses of Indian descent
Living people
British women dramatists and playwrights
1960 births